Islam in Austria is the largest minority religion in the country, practiced by 7.9% of the total population in 2016 according to the Austrian Academy of Sciences. The majority of Muslims in Austria belong to the Sunni denomination. Most Muslims came to Austria during the 1960s as migrant workers from Turkey and Yugoslavia. There are also communities of Arab and Afghan origin.

History

Historian Smail Balić states that the first evidence of Muslims in Austria dates back to nomadic tribes from Asia that entered the region in 895. Following the Ottoman conquest of the Medieval kingdom of Hungary in the 16th century, more Muslims moved into the territory that makes up modern-day Austria. Muslims were expelled after the Habsburg Empire took control of the region once again in the late 17th century but a few were allowed to remain after the signing of the Treaty of Passarowitz in 1718. The Recognition Act in 1874 gave Christian and non-Christian communities including Muslims legal framework to be recognized as Religionsgesellschaften (religious societies). The largest number of Muslims came under Austrian control after the Austro-Hungarian occupation of Bosnia and Herzegovina in 1878.

In 1904 Bosnian Muslim students in Vienna established the first Muslim association in Austria, the Islamitisch akademischer Verein „Zvijezda" (Islamite Academic Association "Zvijezda"). In 1907 some of its members split from it and established the second Muslim association in Vienna, the Verein der fortschrittlichen islamitischen akademischen Jugend „Svijest" (Association of Progressive Islamite Academic Youth "Svijest"). After the Annexation of Bosnia and Herzegovina in October 1908 "Svijest" organized an action committee for gaining recognition of Islam in Austria (Aktionskomitee zur Erlangung der Anerkennung des Islam in Österreich). Austria recognized Muslims ("of the hanafite rite") as a religious society and regulated their religious freedoms with the so-called Islamgesetz (Islam Law) in 1912.

After the collapse of the Austro-Hungarian Empire following World War I, only a few Muslims remained in the border of the new First Austrian Republic. In 1932 a private association called the Islamischer Kulturbund was set up by Zeki Aly, Mohammed Ali Binni and Baron Omar Rolf von Ehrenfels, its first president, to organize remaining and new Muslims in the country. However, the organization was promptly dissolved in 1939 following the Anschluss. Ehrenfels, being a critic of the Nazi Party, fled Austria.

In late 1942 Muslims in Vienna headed by the student Muhidin Hećimović established a religious organization called Islamische Gemeinde zu Wien (Islamic Parish in Vienna), but which due to frictions with the local Nazi authorities was rather registered as a private association under the modified name Islamische Gemeinschaft zu Wien (Islamic Community in Vienna) in 1943. In late 1943 Salih Hadžialić, an employee of the Croatian embassy in Berlin, was installed as its president due to political pressure. Although the organization was formally dissolved as a private association in Vienna in 1948, it continued its activity in Salzburg and the American zone in general as of 1945. There it was reestablished under the name Moslemische religiöse Gemeinschaft Salzburg (Moslem Religious Community Salzburg) under the protection of the U.S. Military Administration in Austria, where it was responsible for the religious care of about 1000 Muslim displaced persons.

Substantive Muslim immigration to Austria began in the 1960s when Gastarbeiter from Yugoslavia and Turkey moved to the country. The Islamische Glaubensgemeinschaft in Österreich (Community of Muslim believers in Austria) was organized in accordance to the Islamgesetz in 1979. Many Muslim refugees of the Yugoslav Wars also moved to Austria during the 1990s.

In 2013, Austria granted the status of a recognized religious community to Alevism.

In February, 2015, a new  was passed by the Austrian parliament, illegalizing foreign funding of mosques and paying salaries of imams. Contrary to reports in the media, the law does not regulate the version of the Koran that may be used in Austria, but central tenets of the religion must be presented to the authorities in German. It also gives Muslims additional rights, such as the rights to halal food and pastoral care in the military. The minister for Foreign Affairs, Sebastian Kurz, said the changes were intended to "clearly combat" the influence of Islamic extremism in Austria. The leader of Central Council of Muslims in Germany, Aiman Mazyek, called the law "positive and productive (befruchtend) for the discussion in Germany".

In October 2017, the Austrian government passed a law named the "Prohibition on the Covering of the Face." The law was introduced by the center-left Chancellor Christian Kern. Anyone wearing clothes that obscure their face in public is liable to a fine of €150 and must remove the offending garment "on the spot" if ordered by police. Many activists and experts labeled the law Islamophobic arguing that it discriminated against Muslim women who wore religious face veils. Among the opponents of the law were President Alexander Van der Bellen, Georgetown University senior research fellow Farid Hafez, and Austrian Islamic Religious Authority spokeswoman Carla Amina Baghajati. Face veils in Austria are rare, with about 100-150 Muslim women wearing some type of face covering. Prior to the passing of the ban, thousands of people protested in Vienna in January 2017 to express opposition to the law. However, in European countries, that have introduced similar laws, the bans were upheld by the European court of human rights (ECHR).

In 2018, chancellor Sebastian Kurz announced that Austria would close seven mosques and deport 40 imams paid by Turkey through the Diyanet organisation as measures to thwart political Islam. In the announcement parallel societies, islamism and radicalisation were stated to have no place in Austrian society.

In October 2018, Austria banned headscarves for children in Kindergarten. The ban was motivated by protecting children from family pressure to wear the headscarf. According to an Austrian teacher's union, a ban for pupils aged up to 14 years should be considered as that is the religious legal age (German: religionsmündig).

In March 2019, cabinet announced that it aims to create a new institution, which should from 2020 monitor and document activities regarding political Islam in the country. Citing studies which show that a significant number of Austrian Muslims hold anti-western and antisemitic views, Kurz said that it would be necessary to monitor mosques, clubs, ideology and social media contributions in context with fundamental Islam in order to protect the liberal, democratic and secular society. The organisation should get a similar role on islamic extremism as the Documentation Centre of Austrian Resistance (DÖW) has on right wing extremism, according to the cabinet. Leading figures form the DÖW have principally welcomed the government's plan and confirmed that there is a need to take a closer look at the dangers of political Islam.

Population by year

Demographics
The last census in Austria that collected data on religion was in 2001. That census found that there were 338,988 Muslims in the country, making up 4.2% of the population. Statistics Austria estimated in 2009 that 515,914 Muslims lived in Austria. Work by Ednan Aslan and Erol Yıldız that used data from the 2009 Statistics Austria report estimated that 573,876 Muslims lived in Austria in 2012, making up 6.8% of the population.

The majority of Muslims in Austria are Austrian citizens. The most common foreign citizenships among Muslims in Austria are Turkish (21.2%), Bosnian (10.1%), Kosovar (6.7%), Montenegrin (6.7%), and Serbian (6.7%).

Almost 216,345 Austrian Muslims (38%) live in the capital, Vienna. Roughly 30% of Muslims live in northern state outside of Vienna and an equal number (30%) live in the southern states of Austria.

Ethnicity 
The majority of Austrian Muslims have a Turkish or Balkan background.

Branches 
An August 2017 survey by the Bertelsmann Stiftung foundation found that among Austrian Muslims, 64% were Sunni and 4% were Shia. Medien-Servicestelle Neue Österreicher estimated in 2010 that 10-20% of Austrian Muslims were Alevi.

Identity
Almost 88% of Austrian Muslims feel closely connected with Austria and more than 62% of Muslims have routine leisure time contact with people of other religions, according to the Bertelsmann survey from August 2017. The same survey was also implemented in Germany and several right-wing German newspapers, including Die Welt, Frankfurter Allgemeine Zeitung, Wirtschaftswoche have called the results concerning "close connection" superficial and too optimistic, because the study does not contain any information as to whether participants' values are compatible with western values

Turkish president Recep Tayyip Erdoğan, whose political style is described as increasingly authoritarian and undemocratic, and his Islamic-conservative AKP Party gain huge election successes with Turkish citizens in Austria with up to 70 percent of votes. Critics see this as a clear sign of failed integration. In 2016 Sebastian Kurz, then foreign minister, from the ÖVP and some FPÖ members have urged participants of a pro-Erdoğan demonstration to leave Austria.

Religiosity and fundamentalism
In an August 2017 survey by the Bertelsmann Stiftung foundation, 42% of Austrian Muslims said they were "highly religious" and 52% were "moderately religious."

Austrian Muslims show high fundamental religious values and hostility against other groups according to a study that was published by WZB Berlin Social Science Center in 2013. Different approval rates also persisted after factors such as education, income, marital status, age and gender were taken into account, the study concluded that the reason is to some extent the religion.

2020 raid on Islamists 
On 9 November 2020, Austrian authorities undertook police action against Hamas and Muslim Brotherhood networks in the country and 60 locations were searched. During the raids, 70 people were apprehended on suspicion of belonging to a terrorist organization, money laundering and the financing of terrorist activities.

Culture
A Tag der offenen Moschee (Open Mosque Day) was first organized in October 2013 with the aim of building interfaith connections between Austrian Muslims and non-Muslims. The event has continued every year since.

Education and income
According to the MIPEX Index, access barriers to the labor market for immigrants are relatively low but unemployment is significantly more common among Muslims than among the average population at large. Approximately 40% Muslims born in Austria leave school before age 17.

Religious infrastructure 

There are 205 registered mosques in Austria with hundreds more unregistered prayer rooms. There are four mosques in the country that were purpose-built with minarets.

Despite a large amount of Balkan Muslims in the country, most Muslim organizations in Austria are dominated by Turks. The largest Muslim organization in the country is the Islamische Glaubensgemeinschaft in Österreich (Community of Muslim believers in Austria). The Glaubensgemeinschaft has two constituent members, the Austrian Turkish Islamic Union and the Islamic Federation. Muslim Youth Austria is part of the Bundesjugendvertretung (National Youth Representation) mainly focuses on interfaith dialogue with Catholics, Jews, Buddhists and other religious groups in the country. Muslim Youth Austria also campaigns against xenophobia and racism. Alevis in Austria have set up community groups such as the Islamische Alevitische Glaubensgemeinschaft (Muslim Alevi Community in Austria) and the Föderation der Aleviten Gemeinden in Österreich (Federation of Alevi Communities in Austria).

Discrimination 

According to the Rassismus Report 2014, the two most impactful sources of anti-Muslim sentiment in Austria are the tabloid, Neue Kronenzeitung, and the Freedom Party of Austria.

In a 2017 Chatham House survey  65 percent of Austrians supported the statement: "All further migration from mainly Muslim countries should be stopped", while 18 percent disagreed. In a 2018 poll by Der Standard 45 percent answered that they would tolerate a street scene that is dominated by women wearing headscarves, 42 percent would not tolerate it.

Opposition 
In April 2017, President Alexander Van der Bellen said that there may come a day when we will have to ask all women in Austria to wear headscarves in solidarity with Muslim women and to fight what he referred to as "rampant Islamophobia" in the country.

Notable Muslims
Smail Balić, historian
Muhammad Asad, journalist, traveler, and writer.
Muna Duzdar, state secretary in the Federal Chancellery.
Aribert Heim, SS doctor, hid in Egypt as Tarek Farid Hussain.
Farid Hafez, academic.
Baron Omar Rolf von Ehrenfels, journalist

See also 
Baron Omar Rolf von Ehrenfels
Turks in Austria
Syrians in Austria
Bosniaks

References

Sources

Further reading
 

 
 Study for Bundesministerium des Innern: Perspektiven und Herausforderungen in der Integration muslimischer MitbürgerInnen in Österreich, Mathias Rohe, Universität Erlangen. May 2006 (summary by MilitantIslamMonitor.Org: Radical Islam in Europe: Austrian government study concludes 45 % of Muslims unwilling to integrate)
 Anna Strobel: Unique Legal Status - Muslims in Austria From: Herder Korrespondenz, 2006/4, P. 200-2004
 Census 2001: Population 2001 according to religious affiliation, languages, origin and nationality (PDF) , Statistik Austria.

 
Austria